is a city in Mie Prefecture, Japan. , the city had an estimated population of 47,272 in 22,599 households and a population density of 270 persons per km2. Shima hosted the 2016 G7 Summit.

Geography
Shima is located on the southern half of Shima Peninsula in far eastern Mie Prefecture, facing Ise Bay of the Pacific Ocean. The city has a complicated rias coast with two large inlets: Matoya Bay and Ago Bay. Matoya Bay is famous for oyster cultivation and Ago Bay is famous for pearl cultivation. Both are sightseeing spots and all of the city is within the borders of the Ise-Shima National Park.

Shima has three inhabited islands; Watakano Island, Kashiko Island and Masaki Island. Watakano Island is located in Matoya Bay, and the others are in Ago Bay.

Neighboring municipalities
Mie Prefecture
Ise
Toba
Minamiise

Climate
Shima has a Humid subtropical climate (Köppen Cfa) characterized by warm summers and cool winters with light to no snowfall.  The average annual temperature in Shima is 16.6 °C. The average annual rainfall is 1965 mm with September as the wettest month. The temperatures are highest on average in August, at around 26.6 °C, and lowest in January, at around 6.8 °C.

Demographics
Per Japanese census data, the population of Shima has decreased rapidly over the past 20 years.

History
All of Shima was within the borders of ancient Shima Province. With the creation of the modern municipalities system on April 1, 1889, the town of Waga and villages of Katada, Fuseda, Koshiga, and Goza were established. The town of Shima was established on December 1, 1954 by ten merger of these municipalities. Shima was raised to city status on October 1, 2004, from the merger of the former town of Shima with the towns of Ago, Daiō, Hamajima and Isobe (all from Shima District). Recently there has been anger from its famous divers aimed at its sexist new tourist mascot.

Government
Shima has a mayor-council form of government with a directly elected mayor and a unicameral city council of 20 members. Shima contributes two members to the Mie Prefectural Assembly. In terms of national politics, the city is part of Mie 4th district of the lower house of the Diet of Japan.

Economy
Commercial fishing and tourism play important roles in the local economy.

Education
Shima has seven public elementary schools and six public middle schools operated by the city government and two public high schools operated by the Mie Prefectural Department of Education. There is also one private high school.

Transportation

Railway
 Kintetsu Railway - Shima Line
  -  -  -  -  -  -  -  -

Highways
Iseshima Skyline

Local attractions
Two of Japan's fifteen climbable lighthouses are located in Shima: Anorisaki and Daiosaki. Each was featured in the location shooting of two prominent films of the 1950's, Anorisaki in Kinoshita's Times of Joy and Sorrow (1957) and Daiosaki in Ozu's Floating Weeds (1959).

References

External links

 
 

 
Cities in Mie Prefecture
Populated coastal places in Japan